Elizabeth "Archangel Beth" McCoy (born 5 November 1971) is a writer and editor in the role-playing game industry at Steve Jackson Games.

Career
She and her husband Walter Milliken wrote the award-winning supplement GURPS Illuminati University. She was the line editor for the In Nomine role-playing game.

In a lawsuit that received national attention and led to the establishment of the Electronic Frontier Foundation, McCoy, Milliken and Steve Jackson successfully sued the United States Secret Service in 1993 for illegally seizing computers and electronic information.

References

External links

1971 births
21st-century American women
American women writers
GURPS writers
Living people
Place of birth missing (living people)
Role-playing game designers